Browary Lubelskie is a Polish brewery. Founded in 1844 in the abandoned ruins of a monastery, in 1846 it began brewing a Helles-style beer using bottom fermenting technology. A second brewery opened in 1914.

Both breweries were nationalized by the post-war Polish People's Republic. In 1992, the company was privatized and became a joint stock company. In 2001, the brewing operations were moved to the second site and the first site became a corporate headquarters. In 2014, the company renamed itself to Perła - Browary Lubelskie S.A (Perla - Lublin Breweries).

Perła currently owns two breweries, one in Lublin and one in Zwierzyniec. It is available in UK, US, Germany and Australia and is the largest independent brewery in Poland.

Perla (Pils 5% ABV) was awarded a Bronze Medal at the International Beer Challenge BC 2010 awards in the UK.

Beers
Perła Chmielowa (the main brand)
Perła Niepasteryzowana
Perła Export
Perła Mocna
Perła Porter Bałtycki
Zwierzyniec
Goolman
Goolman Strong
Goolman Gold
Carmèll

Marketing
The bottles are typically green with a label that prominently features the green-and-red coat of arms of Lublin that features a white buck.

The buck is locally called "Claudy", and the story is that he was caught in a vine of hops and fell in a pond, creating the famous pilsner.

References

External links

Breweries of Poland
Lublin Voivodeship